Guaimar II may refer to:

 Guaimar II of Salerno (died 946)
 Guaimar II of Amalfi (r. 1047–1052)